Alfred Homer Bennett (born April 1965) is a United States district judge of the United States District Court for the Southern District of Texas.

Biography

Bennett received a Bachelor of Science degree in 1988 from the University of Houston. He received a Juris Doctor in 1991 from the University of Texas School of Law. He served as an attorney at the law firm of Fulbright & Jaworski from 1991 to 1994 and at the law firm of Solar & Fernandes LLP from 1994 to 1998. From 1998 to 2008, he was a solo practitioner, representing individuals and companies in litigation before both Federal and State courts. From 2009 to 2015, he served as the Presiding Judge for the 61st Civil District Court of Texas. From 2010 to 2011, he served as the Administrative Judge for the Harris County Civil District Courts. He also campaigned for the Texas House of Representatives District 146 during the Democratic primary in 2006 but lost to Borris Miles.

Federal judicial service

On September 18, 2014, President Barack Obama nominated Bennett to serve as a United States District Judge of the United States District Court for the Southern District of Texas, to the seat vacated by Judge Kenneth M. Hoyt, who took senior status on March 2, 2013. On December 16, 2014 his nomination was returned to the President due to the sine die adjournment of the 113th Congress. On January 7, 2015, President Obama renominated him to the same position. He received a hearing before the Judiciary Committee on January 21, 2015. On February 26, 2015 his nomination was reported out of committee by voice vote. On April 13, 2015 the United States Senate voted 95–0 in favor of confirmation. He received his judicial commission on April 15, 2015.

See also 
 List of African-American federal judges
 List of African-American jurists

References

External links

1965 births
Living people
African-American judges
Texas lawyers
Texas state court judges
United States district court judges appointed by Barack Obama
21st-century American judges
Judges of the United States District Court for the Southern District of Texas
University of Houston alumni
University of Texas School of Law alumni
People from Ennis, Texas